Mamadou Kansaye (born October 13, 1992) is a Malian footballer who plays for Christos FC in the United States Adult Soccer Association.

Career

College and Amateur
Kansaye began his career at North Carolina State University where he played for one season.  In his only season with the Wolfpack, Kansaye made 15 appearances and tallied two goals and three assists before transferring to UMBC.  After sitting out the 2011 season due to NCAA Transfer rules, Kansaye made a total of 63 appearances for the Retrievers and tallied nine goals and 19 assists.

Kansaye also played for Baltimore Bohemians in the Premier Development League.

Professional
On March 25, 2015, Kansaye signed a professional contract with USL expansion side Charlotte Independence.  He made his professional debut two days later in a 3–2 defeat to Charleston Battery.

In 2017, Kansaye was part of the amateur Christos FC team that competed in the 2017 Lamar Hunt U.S. Open Cup. In their fourth-round match against heavily favored MLS side D.C. United, his free-kick put Christos up 1–0. The team ended up losing, however, 4–1.

References

External links
UMBC Retrievers

1992 births
Living people
Malian footballers
Malian expatriate footballers
NC State Wolfpack men's soccer players
UMBC Retrievers men's soccer players
Baltimore Bohemians players
Charlotte Independence players
Association football midfielders
Sportspeople from Bamako
Expatriate soccer players in the United States
USL League Two players
USL Championship players